ADFM is an initialism which can refer to:
 Medium Auxiliary Floating Dry Docks
 the Democratic Association of Moroccan Women